Benton Township is an inactive township in Webster County, in the U.S. state of Missouri.

Benton Township was erected in 1855, taking its name from Thomas Hart Benton, a U.S. Senator from Missouri.

References

Townships in Missouri
Townships in Webster County, Missouri